Cal Poly Humboldt Natural History Museum is a natural history museum in Arcata, California in the United States.

History

Wells Fargo Bank donated the original location of the museum to Humboldt State University (HSU).

Around 2010, the university was unable to continue to fund the operations of the museum. The museum closed. Eventually, the Humboldt Science Mathematics Center/Redwood Science Project took over the management and the museum reopened. Jeffrey White became the Executive Director and Julie Van Sickle the Manager. Museum administrators sought grants and public support in order to sustain itself. In 2013, it was announced that the museum would move from its original location into the location where it is currently located. The new building was donated by Redwood Capital Bank. It is 2,700 square feet in size. The museum's former building is now a Redwood Capital Bank branch location.

Collections

The museum has over 2,000 natural history objects. Collections include Native American cultural objects. They have a large fossil collection, called the Maloney Fossil Collection, including sand dollars and Busycon contrarium from the Pliocene and a Chlamys from the Miocene.

Exhibitions

Students from CPH assist in the design and curation of exhibitions at the museum. Many exhibits are interactive. Visitors can touch a meteorite, fossils, and dinosaur bone casts. Most of the exhibitions focus on the natural history of the region surrounding the museum.

References

Natural history museums in California
Arcata, California
Natural history of Humboldt County, California
Museums in Humboldt County, California
California State Polytechnic University, Humboldt
Paleontology in California
University museums in California